is a Japanese professional shogi player ranked 6-dan.

Early life
Deguchi was born on April 27, 1987, in Akashi, Hyōgo. He learned how to play shogi while a lower-grade elementary school student from a fellow student. Although he was more interested in soccer at the time, he got asked to play in some local shogi tournaments and did well. He began getting more serious about shogi and started receiving instruction at the Kakogawa Shogi Center in nearby Kakogawa to improve his play. He was accepted into the Japan Shogi Association's apprentice school under the guidance of shogi professional Keita Inoue at the rank of 6-kyū in 2007 when he was a sixth-grade elementary school student. He was promoted to the rank of apprentice professional 3-dan in 2013, and obtained full professional status and the corresponding rank of 4-dan in April 2019 after winning the 64th 3-dan League (October 2018March 2019) with a record of 14 wins and 4 losses.

Shogi professional
In October 2018, Deguchi, still only an apprentice professional 3-dan, advanced to the finals of the 49th  tournament, but lost to shogi professional Sōta Fujii 2 games to none. Deguchi defeated shogi professionals Shingo Sawada (in the second round) and Hirotaka Kajiura (in the semi-finals) to become just the fifth apprentice professional to advance to the finals of the tournament.

Promotion history
Deguchi's promotion history is as follows:
 6-kyū: September 2007
 3-dan: April 2013
 4-dan: April 1, 2019
 5-dan: March 5, 2021
 6-dan: April 2, 2022

Titles and other championships
Deguchi has appeared in a major title match once. He was the challenger to Sōta Fujii in the 7th Eiō title match (April 2022May 2022) but lost the match 3 games to 0.

Personal life
Deguchi married women's shogi professional Keika Kitamura in April 2021.

References

External links
ShogiHub: Professional Player Info · Deguchi, Wakamu

Japanese shogi players
Living people
Professional shogi players
Professional shogi players from Hyōgo Prefecture
1995 births
People from Akashi, Hyōgo